Harriet Fasenfest (born 1953) is an American writer, urban gardener, and food preservation educator in Portland, Oregon. A former owner/operator of several restaurants and cafes, she uses the term "householding" when referring to the practice of home food growing, canning and storage. She published her first book, A Householder's Guide to the Universe, in 2010.

Biography
Fasenfest was born and raised in Bronx, New York. She moved to the Northwest in 1978 where she owned and operated the Bertie Lou's and Harriet's Eat Now cafes. In 1990 she went back to traveling the country, married, moved back to California, and then moved to Georgia in 1992. While there, she began working with Habitat for Humanity International. In 1997 Fasenfest returned to Portland to work as director of the Performance Salon Series at North Portland's North Star Ballroom, an events arena which combined art and performance with social activism, and in 2000 opened her last cafe, Groundswell.

In 2004 she transformed her backyard in Northern Portland into a producing garden. She grows produce with an eye to home canning and storing, and teaches classes in food preservation and backyard gardening. She is the co-owner of Preserve, an educational center for home gardening and food preservation, and creator of the www.portlandpreserve.com website, on which she writes a blog called The Householder's Grab Bag. She also blogs for Culinate.com.

Fasenfest regards home food preservation as a political and economic statement. She uses the term "householding" rather than "homemaking" or "home economics" to describe her work. She published her views on home gardening and food preservation in A Householder's Guide to the Universe: A Calendar of Basics for the Home and Beyond. The book is organized by month and season.

She lives in Portland, Oregon

Bibliography

Book reviews

References

External links
www.householdinguniverse.com/
Householder's Grab Bag
Posts by Harriet Fasenfest on Culinate
"Preserving Food and Friendship" (video)

American food writers
People from the Bronx
Writers from Portland, Oregon
Food preservation
1953 births
Living people